Lorin Nelson Pace (born August 15, 1925) was an American politician who was a Republican member of the Utah House of Representatives and Utah State Senate. An attorney, Pace attended Emporia State University (Bachelor of Arts), Brigham Young University (Bachelor of Laws), and the University of Utah (Juris Doctor) He worked with the United States Department of State as a foreign service officer from 1954 to 1956 at San Pedro Sula, Honduras, where he also served as president of the San Pedro Sula Branch of the Church of Jesus Christ of Latter-day Saints for the first half of 1956. From 1956-1960 Pace served as a mission president for the Church of Jesus Christ of Latter-day Saints based in Buenos Aires, Argentina.

During his time in the House of Representatives, Pace served as Speaker of the House in 1969 and as Minority Leader from 1971 to 1975. He was defeated in the Republican primary for the 1990 election by Delpha Baird. After his legislative career, he served on the board of directors of Canton Industrial. In the early 1990s Pace worked as a government consultant in El Salvador.

References

1925 births
Living people
Latter Day Saints from Arizona
Latter Day Saints from Kansas
Latter Day Saints from Utah
American Mormon missionaries in Argentina
Republican Party Utah state senators
Speakers of the Utah House of Representatives
Republican Party members of the Utah House of Representatives
People from Miami, Arizona
Emporia State University alumni
Brigham Young University alumni
S.J. Quinney College of Law alumni
Utah lawyers
American expatriates in Honduras
Mission presidents (LDS Church)